54th National Board of Review Awards
February 14, 1983
The 54th National Board of Review Awards were announced on December 13, 1982, and given on February 14, 1983.

Top Ten Films 
Gandhi
The Verdict
Sophie's Choice
An Officer and a Gentleman
Missing
E.T. the Extra-Terrestrial
The World According to Garp
Tootsie
Moonlighting
The Chosen

Top Foreign Films 
Mephisto
Das Boot
Three Brothers
Yol
Siberiade

Winners 
Best Film: Gandhi
Best Foreign Film: Mephisto
Best Actor: Ben Kingsley (Gandhi)
Best Actress: Meryl Streep (Sophie's Choice)
Best Supporting Actor: Robert Preston (Victor Victoria)
Best Supporting Actress: Glenn Close (The World According to Garp)
Best Director: Sidney Lumet (The Verdict)
Career Achievement Award: Patricia Neal

External links 
National Board of Review of Motion Pictures :: Awards for 1982

1982
1982 film awards
1982 in American cinema